Suturocythara redferni is a species of sea snail, a marine gastropod mollusk in the family Mangeliidae.

Description

Distribution
This marine species occurs off Georgia, USA

References

 García E.F. 2008. Eight new molluscan species (Gastropoda: Turridae) from the western Atlantic, with description of two new genera. Novapex 9(1): 1-15

External links
 MNHN, Paris:Suturocythara redferni 

redferni
Gastropods described in 2008